"We've Only Just Begun" is a single by the Carpenters, written by Roger Nichols (music) and Paul Williams (lyrics). It was ranked at No. 414 on Rolling Stone magazine's list of "The 500 Greatest Songs of All Time."

Song information
The song was originally recorded by Smokey Roberds, a friend of Nichols, singing under the name of "Freddie Allen". It debuted within a wedding-themed television commercial for Crocker National Bank in California in the winter of 1970, with Paul Williams on vocals. Hal Riney of the San Francisco-based advertising agency Hal Riney & Partners had commissioned the song to help Crocker appeal to young people. The song played over footage of a couple getting married and just starting out. In the song, direct reference to the bank was left out, in part to make the song more marketable. The commercial turned out to be very popular, but it attracted customers in which the bank was not interested: young adult customers with no collateral for loans. The campaign was eventually suspended, and Crocker subsequently franchised it to other banks.

Richard Carpenter saw the TV commercial and guessed correctly that Williams was the vocalist (both of them were under contract to A&M Records). Carpenter ran into Williams on the record company's lot and asked whether a full-length version was available. Although the TV commercial had only two verses and no bridge, Williams stated that there was a bridge and an additional verse, forming a complete song, which was then delivered.

According to Williams in the documentary Close to You: Remembering The Carpenters "We'd had some success with songs before, a few album cuts and some B-sides - but no singles. This was a major break, a chance to get an A-side and maybe even a hit, so we would have absolutely lied through our teeth if there wasn't a full song."

Carpenter selected the composition for the duo's third single and included it on the LP Close to You. Released in late summer 1970, the single featured Karen's lead vocals and the overdubbed harmonies of both siblings. Following their hit "(They Long to Be) Close to You" onto the charts, "We've Only Just Begun" hit No. 1 on the Cash Box singles chart and No. 2 on the U.S. Billboard Hot 100 behind the Jackson 5's "I'll Be There" and the Partridge Family's "I Think I Love You", becoming the pair's second million-selling gold single. It was considered by both Karen and Richard to be their signature song. According to The Billboard Book of Top 40 Hits (6th edition), on the U.S. Adult Contemporary singles chart, it was the duo's best-performing tune, lasting seven weeks at No. 1 (beating the six-week stay at the top of "Close to You"). The song also helped them to win two Grammy Awards in 1971: Best New Artist and Best Contemporary Performance by a Duo, Group, or Chorus (for "Close to You").

Williams recorded his own version of the song for his 1971 album Just an Old Fashioned Love Song.

Cash Box described the song as having "delicious lyrics and a sparkling production."

For Williams, the song was a personal victory; it was his first collaboration with Nichols that resulted in a hit single, and it opened the door to many more thereafter. In 1998, the recording was inducted into the Grammy Hall of Fame for recordings "of lasting quality or historical significance".

Although it only charted at number 28 in the UK Singles Chart in 1970, its subsequent growth in popularity in the UK saw it voted second in The Nation's Favourite Carpenters Song, broadcast by ITV in 2016.

Music video
The music video for the song was shot in a red background with the letters for the word "you". Karen was sitting in the letter "u" while Richard was standing beside her. He also was not playing the piano as he usually did. The video was shot as part of the 1971 television series Make Your Own Kind of Music.

Charts

Weekly charts

Year-end charts

Certifications

Personnel
Karen Carpenter – lead and backing vocals
Richard Carpenter – co-lead & backing vocals, piano, Wurlitzer electronic piano, orchestration
Joe Osborn – bass
Hal Blaine – drums
Doug Strawn – clarinet
Bob Messenger - woodwinds
Jim Horn - woodwinds
Uncredited - tambourine, trumpets

Carpenters compilation appearances
1973 – The Singles: 1969–1973 (1973 remix with intro)
1980 – Beautiful Moments
1985 – Yesterday Once More: Their Greatest Hits (1985 remix)
1989 – Anthology
1991 – From the Top (1991 remix)
1995 – Interpretations: A 25th Anniversary Edition
1997 – Carpenters: Their Greatest Hits And Finest Performances
1998 – Love Songs
2000 – The Singles: 1969-1981
2002 – The Essential Collection
2004 – Gold: 35th Anniversary Edition
2009 – 40/40
2014 – Icon (as part of Universal Music's budget line compilation series)

Notable cover versions
Johnny Mathis, recorded his cover version for his album, Love Story, in 1971. Mathis also released a live version on Johnny Mathis Live In Las Vegas in 1972.
Dionne Warwick (1970), appears on Very Dionne
Curtis Mayfield (1971), appears on Curtis/Live!
Bitty McLean (1995), reached No. 23 on the UK charts
Johnny Hartman (1972), appears on Today
Bing Crosby, recorded for his album Beautiful Memories (1977)

In cinema and television
The song was used in an unusual context in 1408, a film adapted from a short story by Stephen King; it marked the onset of the protagonist's horrific ordeal. It also closed the 2000 gay ensemble, The Broken Hearts Club: A Romantic Comedy, performed by Mary Beth Maziarz.
"We've Only Just Begun" was featured at the conclusion of the Australian film, The Castle, where it was sung by Kate Ceberano. It was also part of the score of John Carpenter's In the Mouth of Madness, where it was heard playing over loudspeakers while the protagonist was committed to a psychiatric hospital. The song was also sung by Carl Weathers in the motion picture, Happy Gilmore, and was featured in the film version of Starsky & Hutch.  It is referenced in the movie Hudson Hawk by James Coburn´s character who said "In the words of the late Karen Carpenter: We´ve only just begun".

See also
List of number-one adult contemporary singles of 1970 (U.S.)
R. Coleman: The Carpenters: the Untold Story (New York, 1995)

References

External links
 

1970 songs
1970 singles
A&M Records singles
Songs written by Paul Williams (songwriter)
Songs written by Roger Nichols (songwriter)
The Carpenters songs
Barbra Streisand songs
Andy Williams songs
Bitty McLean songs
Cashbox number-one singles
RPM Top Singles number-one singles
Songs based on jingles